Yeretuar, also called Umar or Goni, is an Eastern Malayo-Polynesian language in its putative Cenderawasih languages branch, originating from Cenderawasih Bay (Geelvink Bay) in West Papua Province of Western New Guinea, northeastern Indonesia. 

It is not closely related to other languages.

References

South Halmahera–West New Guinea languages
Languages of western New Guinea
Cenderawasih Bay